The men's 110 metres hurdles sprint competition of the athletics events at the 2015 Pan American Games took place on July 24 at the CIBC Pan Am and Parapan Am Athletics Stadium. The defending Pan American Games champion is Dayron Robles of Cuba.

Records
Prior to this competition, the existing world and Pan American Games records were as follows:

Qualification

Each National Olympic Committee (NOC) was able to enter up to two entrants providing they had met the minimum standard (14.08) in the qualifying period (January 1, 2014 to June 28, 2015).

Schedule

Results
All times shown are in seconds.

Semifinals

Wind:

Final
Wind: +0.8 m/s

References

Athletics at the 2015 Pan American Games
2015